Part II is the second studio album by American country musician Brad Paisley. Released on May 29, 2001, through Arista Nashville, it became Paisley's second platinum-certified album in the United States. It produced four singles; "Two People Fell in Love", "Wrapped Around", "I'm Gonna Miss Her (The Fishin' Song)" and "I Wish You'd Stay", which respectively reached number 4, number 2, number 1, and number 7 on the Billboard Hot Country Singles & Tracks (now Hot Country Songs) charts. "Too Country" also entered the country charts from unsolicited airplay.

Written by Darrell Scott, "You'll Never Leave Harlan Alive" was also recorded by Patty Loveless on her 2001 album Mountain Soul and by Kathy Mattea on her 2008 album Coal. The song was featured in the FX TV series Justified.

This album was repackaged with Who Needs Pictures by Sony's Legacy division and released on September 23, 2008.

Background
The title for Paisley's second album as well as the songs on it were inspired by the movie, Father of the Bride Part II, the follow-up to the movie he went to see on his first date with a certain girl several years before his first record deal. They had long since broken up but when the sequel to the movie came out, Paisley couldn't help thinking about her. And wondering if she was thinking about him. "I ended up going to see (the sequel) on the exact day, at the exact same showing that we saw the first one," he says. "I did it on purpose thinking she might be there, too. Well, of course, she wasn't. No one is that psychotic except me."

Disappointed, Paisley channeled his feelings by writing a song with his best friend and frequent songwriting partner, Kelley Lovelace. "We started talking," Paisley says, "and the line came out: 'Hollywood never fails to make a sequel' and 'Why can't love be more like that?' Then, I remember thinking that (Part II) would be a really great title for a second album. And a great concept." To emphasize the sequel theme, the album opens with strings playing "In the Garden", exactly as the previous album had ended.

This event was revisited on Paisley's 2009 album, American Saturday Night during a reprise of the song, "Welcome to the Future".

Track listing

Personnel

Musicians 
 Brad Paisley – lead vocals (1-9, 11, 12, 13), acoustic guitar (1-8, 10-13), electric guitars (1-11), 6-string Tic tac bass (1-6, 8, 9, 10, 12)
 Bernie Herms – acoustic piano (1-12), keyboards (3, 8), Hammond B3 organ (7, 9, 10, 12), string arrangements (8)
 Gary Hooker – acoustic guitar (4, 9), electric guitar (12)
 Ron Block – banjo (1, 10)
 Darrell Scott – banjo (7), dobro (7), mandolin (7), backing vocals (7)
 Jim Heffernan – dobro (1, 10, 12)
 Mike Johnson – steel guitar (1-12), dobro (2)
 Kevin Grantt – bass guitar (1-11), upright bass (10, 12), vocal stylings (10)
 Eddie Bayers – drums (1, 3, 4, 8, 9, 12)
 Ben Sesar – drums (2, 5, 6, 7, 10, 11)
 Mitch McMitchen – percussion (1-12)
 Brian David Willis – guest percussion (9)
 Glen Duncan – fiddle (1-4, 7, 8, 9, 11, 12)
 Justin Williamson – fiddle (1, 2, 3, 5, 6, 9, 10), mandolin (5, 8, 10)
 Carl Marsh – string arrangements and conductor (11)
 Carl Gorodetzky and The Nashville String Machine – strings (8, 11)
 Wes Hightower – backing vocals (1-9, 11)
 Chely Wright – backing vocals (3)
 Sonya Isaacs – backing vocals (7)
 Kenny Lewis – backing vocals (12)
 Bill Anderson – featured vocals (12)
 George Jones – featured vocals (12)
 Buck Owens – featured vocals (12)
 Frank Rogers – radio performer (13)
 Little Jimmy Dickens – introduction (13)
 Eddie Stubbs – introduction (13)

Production
 Frank Rogers – producer 
 Richard Barrow – recording (1-12), mixing 
 Tim Farris – recording (13)
 Brian David Willis – overdub recording, digital editing 
 David Bryant – additional recording 
 Chris Latham – additional recording  
 Chris O'Donnell – additional recording 
 David Schober – additional recording 
 Mike Purcell – recording assistant 
 Steve Short – recording assistant, mix assistant 
 Joe Costa – mix assistant 
 Hank Williams – mastering 
 MasterMix (Nashville, Tennessee) – mastering location 
 Susan Sherrill – production assistant 
 Beth Lee – art direction, design 
 Nigel Parry – photography 
 Lori Turk – grooming 
 Jennifer Kemp – wardrobe stylist 
 Jimmy Glimmer – management 
 JAG Management – management company

Chart performance

Weekly charts

Year-end charts

Singles

Certifications

References

2001 albums
Albums produced by Frank Rogers (record producer) 
Arista Records albums
Brad Paisley albums